Vishnu is a God in Hinduism.

Vishnu may also refer to:
 Vishnu (1995 film), a 1995 Tamil film directed by S. A. Chandrasekar
 Vishnu (2003 film), a 2003 Telugu action romance film by Shaaji Kailas
 Vishnu (band), a Norwegian alternative rock band established in 2003

People with the given name

 Vishnu Raj Atreya (1944–2020), Nepalese writer
 Vishnu Vishal (born 1984), Indian actor in Tamil cinema
 Vishnu Manchu (born 1981), Indian actor in Telugu cinema
 Vishnu Unnikrishnan (born 1987), Indian actor and screenwriter in Malayalam cinema
 Vishnuvardhan (actor) (1950–2009), Indian actor in Kannada cinema
 Vishnuvardhan (director), Indian director in Tamil cinema
Sree Vishnu (born 1984), Indian actor in Telugu cinema

See also
Vishnu Springs, Illinois, a ghost town in the United States
Vishnu Basement Rocks, Precambrian rock unit exposed in Grand Canyon
Vishnu Temple (Grand Canyon), a summit in the Grand Canyon